Wawel is a hill in Kraków, Poland, with an architectural complex built on top of it.

Wawel may also refer to:

Specific buildings on the Wawel Hill in Kraków 
 Wawel Castle
 Wawel Cathedral

Other 
 1352 Wawel, an asteroid
 MS Wawel, a Polish ferry 
 Wawel (company), a Polish confectionery brand
 Wawel Hill (Antarctica), a hill on King George Island off the coast of Antarctica
 Wawel Kraków, a Polish football club
 Wawel (train), an express train linking Poland with Germany

See also